The Vampire Diaries is an American supernatural teen drama television series developed by Kevin Williamson and Julie Plec, based on the book series of the same name written by L. J. Smith. The series premiered on The CW on September 10, 2009, and concluded on March 10, 2017, having aired 171 episodes over eight seasons.

The pilot episode attracted the largest audience for The CW of any series premiere since the network began in 2006; the first season averaged 3.60 million viewers. It became the most-watched series on the network before being supplanted by Arrow. The show has received numerous award nominations, winning four People's Choice Awards and many Teen Choice Awards.

In April 2015, lead actress Nina Dobrev, who played Elena Gilbert, confirmed that she would be leaving the show after its sixth season. Dobrev returned to record a voiceover for the seventh-season finale and returned as a guest star in the series finale. In March 2016, The CW renewed the series for an eighth season, but in July of that year announced that the eighth season, consisting of 16 episodes, would be the show's last. The final season began airing on October 21, 2016, and ended March 10, 2017.

The concepts and characters developed in the series served to launch a media franchise that includes other television series, web series, novels and comic books. The television series The Originals (2013–2018)which also aired on The CWwas the first major entry in this collection of connected works, followed by a spin-off of The Originals entitled Legacies (2018–2022), which aired on The CW as well.

Series overview
The series is set in the fictional town of Mystic Falls, Virginia, a town charged with supernatural history. It follows the life of Elena Gilbert (Nina Dobrev), a teenage girl who has just lost both parents in a car crash, as she falls in love with a 162-year-old vampire named Stefan Salvatore (Paul Wesley), who she thinks is just a normal human. Their relationship becomes increasingly intricate as Stefan's mysterious older brother Damon Salvatore (Ian Somerhalder) returns to Mystic Falls with a plan to bring back their past love, Katherine Pierce, who is Elena's doppelgänger. Although Damon initially holds a grudge against his brother for forcing him to become a vampire, he later reconciles with Stefan and falls in love with Elena, creating a love triangle among the three. Both brothers attempt to protect Elena as they face various villains and threats to their town, including Katherine. The Salvatore brothers' pasts and the town's history along with its secrets are revealed through flashbacks as the series goes on.

Additional storylines revolve around the other inhabitants of the town, most notably Elena's younger brother Jeremy Gilbert (Steven R. McQueen) and aunt Jenna Sommers (Sara Canning), her best friends Bonnie Bennett (Kat Graham) and Caroline Forbes (Candice King), their mutual friends Matt Donovan (Zach Roerig) and Tyler Lockwood (Michael Trevino), Matt's older sister Vicki Donovan (Kayla Ewell), and their history teacher, vampire hunter Alaric Saltzman (Matthew Davis). The town's politics are orchestrated by the Founders' council, comprising descendants of the founding families: the Fells, the Forbes, the Lockwoods, the Gilberts, and the Salvatores. They guard the town mainly from vampires and other supernatural threats such as werewolves, witches, hybrids (werewolf/vampire), and ghosts.

Cast and characters

 Nina Dobrev as Elena Gilbert (season 1–6; guest season 8), a young orphan who falls in love with vampire Stefan Salvatore and later his brother, Damon, creating a love triangle. When Stefan shuts his humanity off after being blackmailed by Klaus, Damon is given the opportunity to grow closer to Elena. This results in her being further drawn into the supernatural world and results in her struggling to survive supernatural events in the town. In the sixth-season finale, Elena's life was tied to Bonnie's in such a way that as long as Bonnie is alive, Elena will remain asleep. Damon put Elena in a coffin and had her hidden in a warehouse in Brooklyn for the next 60 years or so while he waits for her to wake up. In the series finale, Elena's curse is broken, she reunites with Damon, and they live a long and happy life together with her becoming a doctor.
Dobrev also portrays Elena's doppelgänger, Katerina Petrova, also known as Katherine Pierce. Dobrev sporadically appeared as Katherine in subsequent seasons, with Katherine playing a significant role in the fifth season. 
Dobrev also plays the progenitor of the Petrova doppelgängers and Silas's true love, Amara, during the fifth season, whom he had sought in the afterlife for two thousand years.
 Paul Wesley as Stefan Salvatore, a good-hearted and affectionate vampire and the complete opposite of his older brother, Damon Salvatore. Later in the series, Stefan reverts to his old ways as a Ripper to save Damon from a werewolf bite. His role becomes more antagonistic, after being forced to turn his humanity off. Eventually, he returns to his good-hearted and caring self and reconciles with Elena, but the relationship doesn't last long. He becomes human again and marries Caroline in the eighth season and is killed afterwards in the series finale as he sacrifices himself to save Mystic Falls. Stefan finds peace in the afterlife with Lexi, his best friend who was killed by Damon in the first season.
Wesley also portrays his revealed doppelgänger, Silas, the world's first immortal being, in the fourth and fifth seasons.
Wesley also played another doppelgänger, Tom Avery, during the fifth season.
 Ian Somerhalder as Damon Salvatore, Stefan's malevolent vampire brother. He is mostly thought of as selfish and manipulative, but later on begins to display a more caring side. Throughout the series, Damon is able to repair his relationship with Stefan, and becomes best friends with Alaric and Bonnie. Though his love for Elena is initially one-sided, she begins to develop feelings for him as they work together to save Stefan after he's given in to his Ripper side. They begin dating in the fourth season, after Elena transitions into a vampire, and continue to have an on-and-off relationship until a now human Elena is put into her deep sleep at the end of the sixth season. They reunite in the series finale when Elena wakes up from the sleeping spell, they get married, and spend the remainder of their lives together.
 Steven R. McQueen as Jeremy Gilbert (seasons 1–6; guest season 8), Elena's younger brother, later revealed to be her biological cousin. He later becomes a member of The Five, a vampire hunting group. Jeremy is killed in the fourth season after Katherine throws him onto Silas, who drains his blood. He is resurrected by Bonnie Bennett, his love interest, in the fourth-season finale. In the sixth season, he leaves Mystic Falls to hunt vampires, unbeknownst to everyone other than Alaric. Jeremy returns to Mystic Falls after Elena's curse is broken, and begins working as a teacher at the Salvatore Boarding School for the Young & Gifted.
 Sara Canning as Jenna Sommers (seasons 1–2; guest seasons 3, 5 & 8), Elena and Jeremy's aunt and legal guardian. Jenna was killed in season two during Klaus' ritual after being turned into a vampire. She finds peace in the afterlife with her family.
 Kat Graham as Bonnie Bennett, Elena and Caroline's best friend and a very powerful witch. She has died numerous times but always found a way to return. She develops and controls her powers with the help of her grandmother, Sheila or "Grams", another witch in the family. She is often able to use her magic to help the group, and while she initially hates vampires, particularly Damon, she ends up warming up to them and they become best friends after being stuck in a prison world with him for four months. Bonnie has lost and regained her ability to do magic multiple times throughout the show. She spent the second through fifth seasons in an on-again, off-again relationship with Elena's brother Jeremy and later became involved with Enzo. In the seventh season, Bonnie faces the challenge of having received Rayna Cruz's hunters' curse, which puts all her vampire friends at risk. In the series finale, Bonnie breaks the sleeping spell on Elena and leaves Mystic Falls to travel the world while a deceased Enzo watches over her from the afterlife.
 Candice King as Caroline Forbes, Elena and Bonnie's best friend, who was insecure and often jealous of Elena at first, but after becoming a vampire in the second season becomes more caring and sympathetic. Neurotic but lovable, Caroline has been the love interest of many of the male characters. Initially serving as Damon's plaything in the first season, which she still hates him for, she has had serious relationships with Matt, Tyler, Alaric, and Stefan, and was long the subject of Klaus's adoration. Caroline gives birth to Alaric and Jo's twin daughters after becoming pregnant with them through a spell cast by the Gemini Coven. She married Stefan shortly before his death in the eighth season and repaired her relationship with Damon. Caroline raises the twins with Alaric, with whom she opens the Salvatore Boarding School for the Young & Gifted, as her mother watches over her from the afterlife.
 Zach Roerig as Matt Donovan, Vicki's younger brother and Elena's childhood friend and ex-boyfriend, who became romantically involved with Caroline in the first season. They remain good friends even after breaking up during the second season. Matt wants no part in the supernatural events in his town and later is at odds with the vampires as he becomes a police officer and tries to protect the town from them. He becomes the sheriff in the eighth season and plans to run for mayor.
 Kayla Ewell as Vicki Donovan (season 1; recurring seasons 3 & 8; guest seasons 2 & 5), the drug-addicted older sister of Matt. She appears to be dating Tyler but is also interested in Jeremy. She is turned into a vampire by Damon and is killed by Stefan shortly after. Following the destruction of the Other Side, the supernatural limbo where she resided after her death, Vicki was sent to Hell. She reappears in the series finale where she rings the Maxwell bell 12 times and calls upon hellfire, which destroys Hell. Vicki later finds peace with Tyler in the afterlife and watches over Matt. Ewell left the show after the first season but has appeared as a guest in multiple seasons since.
 Michael Trevino as Tyler Lockwood (seasons 1–6; guest seasons 7–8), a werewolf, later turned into a hybrid, Matt's best friend, and the son of the mayor of Mystic Falls. His family carry a lycanthropic trait, being descended from an ancient werewolf clan. His uncle Mason was also a werewolf, who was killed by Damon in the second season. He was turned into the first successful hybrid by Klaus. In the fifth-season finale, he is returned to being just a human. He reactivates his werewolf gene and leaves town at the end of the sixth season. He appears in a couple episodes of the seventh season, protecting Elena's coffin. He is killed by a humanity-less Damon in the eighth season. Tyler finds peace in the afterlife with Vicki and watches over Matt.
 Matt Davis as Alaric Saltzman (seasons 1–3, 6–8; guest seasons 4–5), a history teacher, vampire hunter, and Jenna's love interest. Davis left the show at the end of season three after Alaric was killed. His character returned as a regular from the sixth season onwards, after he was resurrected in the fifth season. His vampirism is stripped away by magic, turning him into a human again after being saved by Josette Laughlin; the two begin dating. Jo becomes pregnant and they plan to marry, but she is murdered by her brother Malachai at their wedding. The Gemini coven, Jo's witch family, was able to transfer the babies to Caroline's womb, and she gives birth to their twin daughters. Caroline and Alaric move to Dallas together and begin a relationship, but end it when Caroline decides to be with Stefan after his return at the end of the seventh season. Alaric establishes the Salvatore Boarding School for the Young & Gifted with Caroline, with whom he raises the twins, as Jo watches over him from the afterlife.
 Joseph Morgan as Klaus Mikaelson (seasons 3–4, recurring season 2; guest seasons 5 & 7), the Original Hybrid, who begins to build an army of new "hybrids", which are half vampire and half werewolf. During the third season, Klaus began to develop feelings for Caroline and falls in love with her. Klaus eventually moves to New Orleans. He ends the series still in New Orleans, and donates $3 million to Caroline and Alaric's boarding school.
 Michael Malarkey as Enzo St. John (seasons 6–8; recurring season 5), a vampire formerly under the imprisonment of the Augustine society. He was Damon Salvatore's cellmate back in the 1950s when the latter was captured by the Augustines. He and Damon revived their friendship as he searched for his lost lover, Maggie. In the fifth-season episode "Man on Fire", Enzo shut off his humanity after finding out the truth about Maggie's death and is later killed by Stefan, having his heart ripped out. He was resurrected in the fifth-season finale, and later becomes Bonnie's love interest before coming under the control of the monster in the vault at the end of the seventh season. He is killed by a humanity-less Stefan in the eighth season and watches over Bonnie in the afterlife.

Episodes

Production
Initially, Kevin Williamson had little interest in developing the series, as he found the premise too similar to the Twilight novels. However, at the urging of Julie Plec, he began to read the books. He started to become intrigued by the story: "I began to realize that it was a story about a small town, about that town's underbelly and about what lurks under the surface." Williamson has stated the town's story will be the main focus of the series rather than high school.

On February 6, 2009, Variety announced that The CW had green-lit the pilot for The Vampire Diaries with Williamson and Julie Plec set as the head writers and executive producers. On May 19, 2009, the series was officially ordered for the 2009–2010 season.

The pilot episode was filmed in Vancouver, British Columbia. However, the rest of the seasons have been filmed in Covington, Georgia (which doubles as the show's fictional small town of Mystic Falls, Virginia) and various other communities around Greater Atlanta to take advantage of local tax incentives. On the morning of May 10, 2012, a fire broke out in the building on Clark Street in Covington that was used as the setting for Mystic Grill on the show.

The series was given a full 22-episode order on October 21, 2009, after strong ratings for the first half of the season. Now there is a spin-off called The Originals, that goes into depth about the original vampire family from The Vampire Diaries. On February 16, 2010, The CW announced that it had renewed the show for a second season, which premiered on September 9, 2010. On April 26, 2011, The CW renewed the show for a third season. The third season premiered on September 15, 2011. The fourth season premiered on October 11, 2012. The CW renewed the show for a fifth season on February 11, 2013. On February 13, 2014, The CW renewed the series for a sixth season. On January 11, 2015, the CW renewed the series for a seventh season.

On April 6, 2015, lead actress Nina Dobrev confirmed that she and co-star Michael Trevino (who plays Tyler Lockwood) would be leaving the show after its sixth season. Dobrev returned to record a voiceover for the seventh-season finale and returned as a guest star in the series finale. Trevino appeared as a guest star in the seventh and eighth seasons.

On March 11, 2016, The CW renewed the series for an eighth season, but on July 23, 2016, announced that the eighth season, consisting of 16 episodes, would be the show's last. The final season began airing on October 21, 2016, and ended March 10, 2017.
President of The CW, Mark Pedowitz, said in an interview at the summer TCA's that The Vampire Diaries didn't receive an extra episode order for the second season at the request of Kevin Williamson. Kevin Williamson felt to do the best show possible; he would rather do 22 episodes. "I'd rather have a great 22 than a good 24 if Kevin couldn't do it," he explained. The writers first met for the fifth season on April 15, 2013. Filming began on July 10, 2013, and finished on April 10, 2014. On July 23, 2016, it was announced that the show would end after a 16-episode eighth season.

Reception

Critical response

The Vampire Diaries initially received mixed reviews, which through the course of the show, improved significantly. Metacritic gave the show a score of 57 (out of 100) based on reviews from 31 critics, indicating "mixed or average reviews". Entertainment Weekly gave the pilot a B+, declaring that the show "signals a welcome return to form for writer-producer Kevin Williamson." Reviewer, Ken Tucker, ended his review by writing that "Diaries promises us a season of sharp-tongued amusement." Linda Stasi of the New York Post gave the premiere a perfect score, saying that she was "hooked after one episode". Stasi praised the pacing of the episode and the "vicious, bloody vamp action," which "starts in the opening scene and continues throughout The Vampire Diaries with such ferocity and speed that it's truly scary." Conversely, San Francisco Chronicles Tim Goodman, gave the episode a highly critical review, calling the series "awful". Goodman disliked the dialogue and hoped that the extras on Buffy the Vampire Slayer would "return en masse to eat the cast of Vampire Diaries, plus any remaining scripts."

Many TV critics felt the series improved with each episode. Sarah Hughes of The Independent says The Vampire Diaries turns into "a well-crafted, interestingly developed series" despite a mediocre opening episode. The New York Post also praised the portrayal of Elena, finding the character to be a strong-minded woman who did not allow her feelings for her boyfriend to control her. Karla Peterson of The San Diego Union-Tribune said that "the supernatural drama is a first-class production, featuring an insanely gorgeous cast, sharp scripts, and a brooding vibe that is hard for even the most levelheaded adult to resist." Mike Hale of The New York Times gave the series an honorable mention on his list of the top TV shows of 2009.

The show's second season opened to favorable reviews. On Metacritic, it has a score of 78 (out of 100) based on reviews from five critics, indicating "generally favorable reviews". As the series progressed and developed into the third season, critics praised the portrayals of the main characters and the development of the female characters such as Elena Gilbert played by Nina Dobrev, Bonnie Bennett played by Kat Graham, and Caroline Forbes played by Candice King.

The third-season finale, "The Departed", received critical acclaim. Diana Steenbergen of IGN praised the episode and the writers for clearing up a couple of storylines and making all of them come to ahead. She also praised Dobrev's performance in this episode, addressing her behavior as another reason the final revelation from Meredith was more shocking and believable. Similarly, Mandi Bierly of Entertainment Weekly review praised the writer's skills in creating a more unexpected final twist.

Ratings
The series premiere of The Vampire Diaries on September 11, 2009, was The CW's biggest ever at the time, amassing 4.91 million viewers. Adding in DVR numbers, the ratings for the premiere swelled to an official 5.7 million viewers. In 2016, a New York Times study of the 50 TV shows with the most Facebook Likes found that "as with several other shows that focus on the supernatural," The Vampire Diaries was "slightly more popular outside of cities. That said, the show's fandom has the smallest amount of spatial variation of all 50 shows".

The following is a table for the seasonal rankings based on average total estimated viewers per episode of The Vampire Diaries. "Rank" refers to how The Vampire Diaries rated compared to the other television series, which aired during prime time hours.

Accolades

Home media releases
Season one was released on DVD in Regions 1, 2, and 4. Also, on Blu-ray in Regions A and B. Both United States versions include commentary by cast and crew members on selected episodes, deleted scenes, behind-the-scenes featurettes, webisodes, and a downloadable audiobook of L.J. Smith's The Vampire Diaries: The Awakening. It was released on DVD in Region 2 on August 23, 2010. Following that release, Region 1 began selling DVDs on August 31, 2010, and Region 3 on September 1, 2010. In Region A, it was released on Blu-ray on August 31, 2010. Region B's releases varied; the United Kingdom on August 23, 2010, Brazil on August 26, 2010, and Australia on September 1, 2010.

The Vampire Diaries Season 2 will be available on DVD and Blu-ray on August 30, 2011. Region B's releases varied; the United Kingdom on August 22, 2011, Brazil on August 25, 2011. The Vampire Diaries: Season 3 will be available on DVD and Blu-ray on September 11 and A and on September 5, 2012, for Regions 4 and B. The Vampire Diaries: Season 4 was available on DVD and Blu-ray as of September 15, 2013.

In Japan, the fourth season was released in a special collection, including bonuses not available elsewhere. Included in the collection are an ankle bracelet, promotional image cards, and a booklet about the cast.

Spin-off

Former president of entertainment at The CW, Dawn Ostroff, mentioned a spin-off idea in 2010 that she said could happen in a few years. A spin-off was in development for the 2011 fall line-up, but due to Kevin Williamson's commitment to The Secret Circle, it was put on hold indefinitely.

On January 11, 2013, it was announced that a back-door pilot focused on The Originals, starring Joseph Morgan as Klaus titled The Originals would air on April 25 for a potential series pick-up for the 2013–2014 season. This second spin-off attempt was carried out by Julie Plec with no involvement by Kevin Williamson.

On April 26, 2013, The CW announced that The Originals had been ordered to the series premiere in the 2013–14 television season. The Originals premiered on October 3, 2013.

Daniel Gillies as Elijah, Claire Holt as Rebekah, and Phoebe Tonkin as Hayley will also continue to play their characters, originally from The Vampire Diaries, in the new spin-off series.

The Originals is about the Mikaelson siblings, who are the original family of vampires, and their take-over of the French Quarter of New Orleans. The show also involves Hayley and Klaus's daughter, Hope.

Producers reported that there would be a transition of the characters in both series. Claire Holt made a special cameo in The Vampire Diaries, in the episodes "I Know What You Did Last Summer" and "500 Years of Solitude". Michael Trevino made a special cameo on episodes of The Originals, "Bloodletting" and "The River In Reverse". Joseph Morgan, Daniel Gillies, and Claire Holt returned to The Vampire Diaries in a special cameo on the series' 100th episode "500 Years of Solitude". Nina Dobrev also appeared in the fifth episode of The Originals second season, "Red Door", as Tatia, another doppelgänger.

At the Television Critics Association winter 2016 press tour, CW president Mark Pedowitz announced an official crossover between The Vampire Diaries and The Originals, where Stefan goes on the run and finds a haven in New Orleans where he runs into Klaus.

In November 2014, a web series titled The Originals: The Awakening was released as the third show in the franchise. The series explores the character Kol Mikaelson and his relationships with his siblings. Flashing back to 1914, Kol is on a quest to ally with the witches of the French Quarter. Awakening gives answers to some questions about Kol's past, including the origins of his rivalry with his family and the unique backstory he has with the New Orleans witches. Each webisode is approximately two minutes long. The series concluded on December 8, 2014. To date, The Originals: The Awakening is the only web series in The Vampire Diaries universe.

Tie-in material
On October 31, 2013, DC Comics launched a comic book series based on the TV show.

See also
 List of vampire television series
 Vampire film

References

External links
 
 
 

 
2000s American LGBT-related drama television series
2000s American high school television series
2000s American horror television series
2000s American mystery television series
2000s American romance television series
2000s American supernatural television series
2000s American teen drama television series
2009 American television series debuts
2010s American LGBT-related drama television series
2010s American high school television series
2010s American horror television series
2010s American mystery television series
2010s American romance television series
2010s American supernatural television series
2010s American teen drama television series
2010s American drama television series
2017 American television series endings
American fantasy drama television series
American fantasy television series
American romantic drama television series
American horror fiction television series
The CW original programming
Dark fantasy television series
English-language television shows
Horror drama television series
Fiction about interracial romance
Lesbian-related television shows
Gay-related television shows
Nonlinear narrative television series
Romantic fantasy television series
Serial drama television series
Thriller television series
Television shows based on American novels
Television series about siblings
Television series about teenagers
Television series by Alloy Entertainment
Television series by CBS Studios
Television series by Warner Bros. Television Studios
Television series created by Kevin Williamson
Television shows filmed in Georgia (U.S. state)
Television shows set in Atlanta
Television shows set in Virginia
Television about werewolves
Vampires in television
Witchcraft in television